Poland competed at the 1988 Summer Olympics in Seoul, South Korea. Poland returned to the Summer Olympic Games after having boycotted the 1984 Summer Olympics. 143 competitors, 111 men and 32 women, took part in 105 events in 19 sports.

Medalists

Competitors
The following is the list of number of competitors in the Games.

Archery

Poland entered three women in its fourth appearance in Olympic archery.

Women

Athletics

Men
Track & road events

Field events

Women
Track & road events

Field events

Boxing

Men

Canoeing

Sprint
Men

Women

Cycling

Eleven male cyclists represented Poland in 1988.

Road

Track
Pursuit

Points race

Diving

Men

Equestrianism

Eventing

# – Indicates that points do not count in team total
* Only three riders are eligible to qualify for the jumping final.

Fencing

18 fencers, 13 men and 5 women, represented Poland in 1988.

Men

Individual

Team

Women

Individual

Team

Gymnastics

Rhythmic gymnastics

Judo

Men

Modern pentathlon

Three male pentathletes represented Poland in 1988.

Rowing

Men

Women

Sailing

Men

Shooting

Men

Women

Swimming

Men

Women

Table tennis

Tennis

Men

Weightlifting

Men

Wrestling

Men's freestyle

Men's Greco-Roman

References

External links
 1988 Summer Olympics

Nations at the 1988 Summer Olympics
1988
1988 in Polish sport